The Dr. Elmer Bly House, also known as Bly House and The Point, is a historic log house in Port Alsworth, Alaska. It is located on a spit of land adjacent to Hardenburg Bay, an inlet of Lake Clark, and presently houses administrative offices of the Lake Clark National Park and Preserve. The logs used in its construction are sawn on three sides at a local sawmill. The house was built in 1947 by Dr. Elmer Bly, a dentist, and Joe Thompson. Bly operated his dental practice here from 1947 to 1953. It was purchased by the National Park Service 1979, at which time the interior was modernized and the exterior rehabilitated.

The house was listed on the National Register of Historic Places in 2006.

See also
National Register of Historic Places listings in Lake and Peninsula Borough, Alaska
National Register of Historic Places listings in Lake Clark National Park and Preserve

References

National Register of Historic Places in Lake Clark National Park and Preserve
Houses completed in 1947
Houses in Lake and Peninsula Borough, Alaska
Houses on the National Register of Historic Places in Alaska
Log houses in the United States
Buildings and structures on the National Register of Historic Places in Lake and Peninsula Borough, Alaska
Log buildings and structures on the National Register of Historic Places in Alaska
1947 establishments in Alaska